The Resistance Museum is a museum located in the Plantage neighbourhood in Amsterdam, the Netherlands.
The Dutch Resistance Museum, chosen as the best historical museum of the Netherlands, tells the story of the Dutch people in World War II. From 14 May 1940 to 5 May 1945, the Netherlands were occupied by Nazi Germany.

Permanent exhibits of the museum recreate the atmosphere of the streets of Amsterdam during the German occupation of World War II. Big photographs, old posters, objects, films and sounds from that horrible time, help to recreate the scene. The background of the Holocaust is also visualized to the visitor. This is an exhibition about everyday life during that time, but also about exceptional historical events and the resistance of the population against the Nazis and heroism.

The museum building
The building bearing the Star of David and the name of Petrus Plancius (1550-1622), the Renaissance Amsterdam clergyman and geographer, was built in 1876 by the Jewish singing society Oefening Baart Kunst (practice makes perfect). It served for several decades as a Jewish cultural center and synagogue. The Oefening Baart Kunst society kept the Plancius name on its building to underline its respect to the Amsterdam city traditions. Plancius was the name of the old house located there prior to construction of the building. For a long time, the Plancius building served many different functions. Since 1999, after its renovation, it is the seat of the Verzetsmuseum.

Exhibition
The Verzetsmuseum is relatively small when compared to other museums in the Netherlands. The focus of Verzetsmuseum is about the German Occupation as well as the Nazi rule in Holland during the second world war between 1940 and 1945. The building is across the entry to Artis Zoo, and not far away from both the Waterlooplein and the Rembrandt house. The museum aptly shows the persecution of Jews by the Nazis and world war two in general.

See also
NIOD Institute for War, Holocaust and Genocide Studies
Overloon War Museum

References

External links

Tourist info

World War II museums in the Netherlands
National museums of the Netherlands
Museums in Amsterdam
Synagogues completed in 1876
Cultural infrastructure completed in 1876
Museums established in 1999
1999 establishments in the Netherlands
Synagogues preserved as museums
20th-century architecture in the Netherlands